Ammotrophus cyclius is a species of sand dollar of the family Clypeasteridae. Their external skeleton, known as a test, is covered with spines. It belongs to the genus Ammotrophus and lives in the seas off southern Australia. Ammotrophus cyclius was first scientifically described in 1928 by Hubert Clark.

References 

Clypeasteridae
Animals described in 1928
Taxa named by Hubert Lyman Clark